Giraffatitan (name meaning "titanic giraffe") is a genus of sauropod dinosaur that lived during the late Jurassic Period (Kimmeridgian–Tithonian stages) in what is now Lindi Region, Tanzania. It was originally named as an African species of Brachiosaurus (B. brancai), but this has since been moved to its own genus. Giraffatitan was for many decades known as the largest dinosaur but recent discoveries of several larger dinosaurs prove otherwise; giant titanosaurians appear to have surpassed Giraffatitan in terms of sheer mass. Also, the sauropod dinosaur Sauroposeidon is estimated to be taller and possibly heavier than Giraffatitan.

History of discovery

In 1906, mining engineer Bernhard Wilhelm Sattler, while travelling, noticed an enormous bone jutting out of the ground at the Tendaguru (the "steep hill") near Lindi, in what was then German East Africa, today Lindi Region, Tanzania. In early 1907, his superior Wilhelm Arning in Hannover received a report on the find. Arning again informed the Kommission für die landeskundliche Erforschung der Schutzgebiete, a commission in Berlin overviewing the geographical investigation of German protectorates. The German secretary of state of colonies, Berhard Dernburg, at the time visited German East Africa accompanied by the industrialist Heinrich Otto. Otto had invited the paleontologist Professor Eberhard Fraas to join him as a scientific advisor. In the summer of 1907, Fraas, already for some months travelling the colony, received a letter from Dr Hans Meyer in Leipzig urging him to investigate Sattler's discovery. On 30 August, Fraas arrived by steamer at the coastal town of Lindi. A five-day march brought him to the Tendaguru, where he could confirm that the bones were authentic and dinosaurian. Soon Sattler joined him with a team of native miners who uncovered two large sauropod skeletons which were transported to Germany. Ultimately, these would become the holotypes of the genera Tornieria and Janenschia.

Fraas had observed that the Tendaguru layers were exceptionally rich in fossils. After his return to Germany he tried to raise enough money for a major expedition. He managed to attract the interest of Professor Wilhelm von Branca, the head of the Geologisch-Paläontologische Institut und Museum der Königliche Friedrich-Wilhelm Universität zu Berlin. Von Branca considered it a matter of German national pride that such a project would succeed. He involved the well-connected pathologist David von Hansemann. Von Hansemann founded a Tendaguru Committee headed by Johann Albrecht, the duke of Mecklenburg. Soon it became fashionable to join this committee which counted a large number of prominent German industrialists and scientists among its members. Many of their rich friends donated considerable sums. To lead the expedition, von Branca sent out one of his curators, Werner Janensch, and one of his assistants, Edwin Hennig. Both men arrived in Dar es Salaam on 2 April 1909.
 
The expedition initially employed about 160 native porters as beasts of burden could not be used because of the danger posed by the tse tse fly.  During four field seasons, of 1909, 1910, 1911 and 1912, about a hundred paleontological quarries were opened. Large amounts of fossil material were shipped to Germany. Soon it became evident that apart from Tornieria and Janenschia, other sauropods were present in the layers. One was the medium-sized Dicraeosaurus, a relatively common find. More rare was a gigantic form that far surpassed the others in magnitude and that is today known as Giraffatitan. The first quarry with Giraffatitan material was "Site D", located about one kilometre northeast of the Tendaguru Hill and opened on 21 June 1909. It contained a relatively complete skeleton of a medium-sized individual, lacking the hands, the neck, the back vertebrae and the skull. It included an articulated series of twenty-nine tail vertebrae. The other bones were found in close association on a surface of twenty-two square metres. "Site IX", located 1.4 kilometres northeast of the Tendaguru Hill, was opened on 17 August 1909. Among an assemblage of 150 disarticulated dinosaur bones, also two Giraffatitan thighbones were present. The next Giraffatitan quarry was "Site N", at nine hundred metres east of the Tendaguru Hill, excavated in September 1909. It held a single disarticulated skeleton containing a back vertebra, a tail vertebra, ribs, a scapula. a possible scapula, a humerus, two ischia and a number of unidentifiable bones.

The most important source of Giraffatitan fossils would be "Site S" at one kilometre southwest of the hill. Excavations started on 11 October 1909 and continued well into 1912. In 1909 limb and girdle elements were dug up. During 1910, a cut bank of the Kitukituki river was gradually deepened, removing a high overburden. To prevent the quarry walls from collapsing, they were covered by a high wooden framework. That year, first several ribs were uncovered and later part of the vertebral column. In October, close to some neck vertebrae a skull and lower jaws were discovered. From 5 June 1912 onwards more neck and trunk vertebrae were found. Initially it was thought that a single skeleton was being uncovered. Only much later Janensch realised that two skeletons had been present. Skelett SI was represented by a skull, six neck vertebrae and some back vertebrae. Skelett SII was larger but despite its size still a subadult individual. It included skull bones, a series of eleven neck and eleven back vertebrae, ribs, the left scapula, both coracoids, both forelimbs, the pubic bones and the right hindlimb. The sacrum and the tail had been lost to relatively recent erosion. The animal was found in an upright position with vertical limbs, which has been explained by its becoming mired in mud.

In early October 1909, "Site ab" was excavated, 1.2 kilometres northeast of the hill. Among disarticulated remains of many sauropods, also two Giraffatitan thighbones were collected. A gigantic possible humerus was too damaged to be salvaged. "Site cc", 2.9 kilometres northeast of the hill, contained a disarticulated Giraffatitan skeleton including neck vertebrae, a trunk vertebra, ribs, a scapula and a humerus. In 1910, another Giraffatitan quarry was opened, "Site Y" at 3.1 kilometres north of the Tendaguru Hill. It contained the skeleton of a medium-sized individual including a braincase, a series of eight neck vertebrae, a trunk vertebra, ribs, both scapulae, a coracoid, a left humerus and a left fibula.

The quarries listed above represent only the most important sites where Giraffatitan bones were found. In dozens of other Tendaguru locations, finds were made of large single sauropod bones that were referred to the taxon in Janensch's publications but of which no field notes survive so that the precise circumstances of the discoveries are unknown. Partly this reflects a lack of systematic documentation by the expedition. Many documents were destroyed by an allied bombardment in 1943. Part of the fossils were also lost. Nevertheless, most of the skeleton is known.

Giraffatitan brancai was first named and described by German paleontologist Werner Janensch in 1914 as Brachiosaurus brancai, based on several specimens recovered between 1909 and 1912 from the Tendaguru formation. It is known from five partial skeletons, including three skulls and numerous fragmentary remains including skull material, some limb bones, vertebrae and teeth. It lived from 145 to 150 million years ago, during the Kimmeridgian to Tithonian ages of the Late Jurassic period.

A famous specimen of Giraffatitan brancai mounted in the Berlin's Natural History Museum is one of the largest, and in fact the tallest, mounted skeletons in the world, as certified by the Guinness Book of Records. Beginning in 1909, Werner Janensch found many additional G. brancai specimens in Tanzania, Africa, including some nearly complete skeletons, and used them to create the composite mounted skeleton seen today.

Description

Size

Between 1914 and the 1990s, Giraffatitan was claimed to be the largest dinosaur known, (ignoring the possibly larger but lost Maraapunisaurus) and thus the largest land animal in history. In the later part of the twentieth century, several giant titanosaurians found appear to surpass Giraffatitan in terms of sheer mass. However, Giraffatitan and Brachiosaurus are still the largest sauropods known from relatively complete material.

All size estimates for Giraffatitan are based on the skeleton mounted in Berlin, which is partly constructed from authentic bones. The often mentioned length of 22.46 metres is by Werner Janensch, the German scientist who described Giraffatitan, and was the result of a simple adding error: the correct number should have been 22.16 metres. These extreme estimates are now considered unlikely due to flawed methodologies. There are also a large number of such estimations as the skeleton proved to be an irresistible subject for researchers wanting to test their new measuring methods. The first calculations were again made by Janensch. In 1935, he gave a volume of 32 m³ for specimen SII and of 25 m³ for specimen SI, a smaller individual. It is not known how he arrived at these numbers. In 1950, he mentioned a weight of forty tonnes for the larger skeleton. In 1962, Edwin Harris Colbert measured a volume of 86.953 m³. Presuming a density of 0.9, this resulted in a weight of 78,258 kilogrammes. Colbert had inserted a museum model, sold to the public, into sand and observed the volume displaced by it. Gregory S. Paul in 1988 assumed that the, in his opinion, unrealistically high number had been caused by the fact that such models used to be very bloated compared to the real build of the animal. In 1980, Dale Alan Russell et al published a much lower weight of 14.8 tonnes by extrapolating from the diameter of the humerus and the thighbone. In 1985, the same researcher arrived at 29 tonnes by extrapolating from the circumference of these bones. In 1985, Robert McNeill Alexander found a value of 46.6 tonnes inserting a toy model of the British Museum of Natural History into water.

In 1988, G.S. Paul measured a volume of 36.585 m³ by inserting a specially constructed model into water. He estimated a weight of 31.5 tonnes, assuming a low density. In 1994/1995 a weight of 40 tonnes extrapolating from limb bone circumference. In 1995 a laser scan of the skeleton was used to build a virtual model from simple geometrical shapes, finding a volume of 74.42 m³ and concluding to a weight of 63 tonnes. In 2008, Gunga revised the volume, using more complex shapes, to 47.9 m³. Donald Henderson in 2004 employed a computer model that calculated a volume of 32.398 m³ and a weight of 25,789 kilogrammes. Newer methods use bone wall thickness.

However, HMN SII is not the largest specimen known (an assertion supported by its subadult status) but HMN XV2, represented by a fibula 13% larger than the corresponding material on HMN SII, which might have attained  in length. In 2020, Molina-Perez and Larramnedi estimated the size of the HMN XV2 specimen at 25 meters (82 ft) and 48 tonnes (53 short tons), with a shoulder height of 6.8 meters (22 ft).

General build
 
Giraffatitan was a sauropod, one of a group of four-legged, plant-eating dinosaurs with long necks and tails and relatively small brains. It had a giraffe-like build, with long forelimbs and a very long neck. The skull had a tall arch anterior to the eyes, consisting of the bony nares, a number of other openings, and "spatulate" teeth (resembling chisels). The first toe on its front foot and the first three toes on its hind feet were clawed.

Nostrils
 
Traditionally, the distinctive high-crested skull was seen as a characteristic of the genus Brachiosaurus, to which Giraffatitan brancai was originally referred; however, it is possible that Brachiosaurus altithorax did not show this feature, since within the traditional Brachiosaurus material it is known only from Tanzanian specimens now assigned to Giraffatitan.

The placement of Giraffatitan nostrils has been the source of much debate with Witmer (2001) describing in Science the hypothesized position of the fleshy nostrils in Giraffatitan in as many as five possible locations. Comparing the nares of dinosaurs with those of modern animals, he found that all species have their external nostril openings in the front, and that sauropods like Giraffatitan did not have nostrils on top of their heads, but near their snouts. There has also been the hypothesis of various sauropods, such as Giraffatitan, possessing a trunk. The fact that there were no narrow-snouted sauropods (Giraffatitan included) tends to discredit such a hypothesis. Stronger evidence for the absence of a trunk is found in the teeth wear of Giraffatitan, which shows the kind of wear that would result from biting and tearing off of plant matter rather than purely grinding, which would be the result of having already ripped the leaves and branches off with a trunk.

Classification
 
In 1988, Gregory S. Paul noted that Brachiosaurus brancai (on which most popular depictions of Brachiosaurus were based) showed significant differences from the North American Brachiosaurus, especially in the proportions of its trunk vertebrae and in its more gracile build. Paul used these differences to create a subgenus he named Brachiosaurus (Giraffatitan) brancai. In 1991, George Olshevsky asserted that these differences were enough to place the African brachiosaurid in its own genus, simply Giraffatitan.

Further differences between the African and North American forms came to light with the description in 1998 of a North American Brachiosaurus skull. This skull, which had been found nearly a century earlier (it is the skull Marsh used on his early reconstructions of Brontosaurus), is identified as "Brachiosaurus sp." and may well belong to B. altithorax. The skull is closer to Camarasaurus in some features such as the form of the front teeth and more elongated and less hollowed-out on top than the distinctive short-snouted and high-crested skull of Giraffatitan.

The classification of Giraffatitan as a separate genus was not widely followed by other scientists at first, as it was not supported by a rigorous comparison of both species. However, a detailed comparison was published by Michael P. Taylor in 2009. Taylor showed that "Brachiosaurus" brancai differed from B. altithorax in almost every fossil bone that could be compared, in terms of both size, shape, and proportion, concluding that the placement of Giraffatitan in a separate genus was valid. Taylor found evidence of a sister relationship between Giraffatitan and Brachiosaurus, although his analysis omitted other Brachiosaurids. A more recent study on Titanosauriform sauropods by D'Emic (2012) places Giraffatitan as sister to a clade containing Brachiosaurus and a tritomy of Abydosaurus, Cedarosaurus, and Venenosaurus as shown below:

Paleobiology
 
The nostrils of Giraffatitan, like the huge corresponding nasal openings in its skull, were long thought to be located on the top of the head. In past decades, scientists theorized that the animal used its nostrils like a snorkel, spending most of its time submerged in water in order to support its great mass. The current consensus view, however, is that Giraffatitan was a fully terrestrial animal. Studies have demonstrated that water pressure would have prevented the animal from breathing effectively while submerged and that its feet were too narrow for efficient aquatic use. Furthermore, new studies by Lawrence Witmer (2001) show that, while the nasal openings in the skull were placed high above the eyes, the nostrils would still have been close to the tip of the snout (a study which also lends support to the idea that the tall "crests" of brachiosaurs supported some sort of fleshy resonating chamber).

Brain
Giraffatitans brain measured about 300 cubic centimetres, which, like those of other sauropods, was small compared to its massive body size. A 2009 study calculated its Encephalization Quotient (a rough estimate of possible intelligence) at a low 0.62 or 0.79, depending on the size estimate used. Like other sauropods, Giraffatitan has a sacral enlargement above the hip which some older sources misleadingly referred to as a "second brain". However, glycogen bodies are a more likely explanation.

Metabolism
If Giraffatitan was endothermic (warm-blooded), it would have taken an estimated ten years to reach full size, if it were instead poikilothermic (cold-blooded), then it would have required over 100 years to reach full size. As a warm-blooded animal, the daily energy demands of Giraffatitan would have been enormous; it would probably have needed to eat more than ~182 kg (400 lb) of food per day. If Giraffatitan was fully cold-blooded or was a passive bulk endotherm, it would have needed far less food to meet its daily energy needs. Some scientists have proposed that large dinosaurs like Giraffatitan were gigantotherms. Internal organs of these giant sauropods were probably enormous.

Paleoecology
 
Giraffatitan lived in what is now Tanzania in the Late Jurassic Tendaguru Formation. Since 2012, the boundary between the Kimmeridgian and Tithonian is dated at 152.1 million years ago.

The Tendaguru ecosystem primarily consisted of three types of environment: shallow, lagoon-like marine environments, tidal flats and low coastal environments; and vegetated inland environments. The marine environment existed above the fair weather wave base and behind siliciclastic and ooid barriers. It appeared to have had little change in salinity levels and experienced tides and storms. The coastal environments consisted of brackish coastal lakes, ponds and pools. These environments had little vegetation and were probably visited by herbivorous dinosaurs mostly during droughts. The well vegetated inlands were dominated by conifers. Overall, the Late Jurassic Tendaguru climate was subtropical to tropical with seasonal rains and pronounced dry periods. During the Early Cretaceous, the Tendaguru became more humid. The Tendaguru Beds are similar to the Morrison Formation of North America except in its marine interbeds.

Giraffatitan would have coexisted with fellow sauropods like Dicraeosaurus hansemanni and D. sattleri, Janenschia africana, Tendaguria tanzaniensis and Tornieria africanus; ornithischians like Dysalotosaurus lettowvorbecki and Kentrosaurus aethiopicus; the theropods "Allosaurus" tendagurensis, "Ceratosaurus" roechlingi, "Ceratosaurus" ingens, Elaphrosaurus bambergi, Veterupristisaurus milneri and Ostafrikasaurus crassiserratus; and the pterosaur Tendaguripterus recki. Other organisms that inhabited the Tendaguru included corals, echinoderms, cephalopods, bivalves, gastropods, decapods, sharks, neopterygian fish, crocodilians and small mammals like Brancatherulum tendagurensis.

See also

List of African dinosaurs
Dinosaurs of Tendaguru
Brachiosauridae
Sauropoda
Sauropodomorpha

References

Bibliography
Maier, Gerhard. 2003. African dinosaurs unearthed: the Tendaguru expeditions. Life of the Past Series (ed. J. Farlow). Indiana University Press, Bloomington, Indiana

Brachiosaurs
Late Jurassic dinosaurs of Africa
Taxa named by Gregory S. Paul
Fossil taxa described in 1988
Tendaguru fauna